The 1992 United States Senate election in California took place on November 3, 1992, at the same time as the special election to the United States Senate in California. Incumbent Democrat Alan Cranston decided to retire. Democrat Barbara Boxer won the open seat. This election was noted as both of California's senators were elected for the first time. This is not a unique occurrence; it would happen again in Tennessee in 1994, Kansas in 1996, and Georgia in 2021. Fellow Democrat Dianne Feinstein, California's senior senator, won the special election and was inaugurated in November 1992.

Democratic primary

Candidates
 Barbara Boxer, U.S. Representative from Greenbrae
 Charles Greene, perennial candidate
Mel Levine, U.S. Representative from Santa Monica
Leo T. McCarthy, Lieutenant Governor of California and nominee for Senate in 1988

Results
In the primary election in June, Boxer defeated McCarthy and Levine with 43.6% of the vote.

Republican primary

Candidates
 Sonny Bono, Mayor of Palm Springs and retired entertainer, best known as a member of the duo Sonny & Cher
 John M. Brown, resident of Stockton
 Tom Campbell, U.S. Congressman from Silicon Valley
 Bruce Herschensohn, political commentator for KABC-TV in Los Angeles and candidate for Senate in 1986
 Alexander Swift Justice, candidate for U.S. Representative in 1990
 John W. Spring, independent candidate for Senate in 1986
 Isaac Park Yonker, candidate for U.S. Representative in 1990 from Mariposa

Results

Peace and Freedom primary

Candidates
Genevieve Torres, 
Shirley Lee

Results

General election

Campaign 
The general election between Boxer and Herschensohn was very close. At the eleventh hour, controversy emerged that the Republican nominee attended a strip club, which some Republican operatives later blamed for Herschensohn's loss.

Four days before Election Day polls showed Herschensohn had narrowed a double digit deficit, trailing by 3 points. Political operative Bob Mulholland disrupted a campaign appearance with a large poster advertising a strip club shouting "Should the voters of California elect someone who frequently travels the strip joints of Hollywood?" Herschensohn admitted he had visited a strip club once, with his girlfriend and another couple.  With press coverage of the story, Herschensohn spent the waning days of the campaign denying related allegations. When the votes were cast and counted, Boxer won the election by five points. Although Republicans have blamed the defeat on the underhanded tactics of the Boxer campaign, evidence of the connection between Mulholland's outburst and the campaign never surfaced.

Results
The election was very close. Boxer was declared the winner by the Associated Press at 1:22 A.M. Pacific Coast Time.

By county
Final results from the Secretary of State of California.

See also
 1992 United States Senate elections

References

External links
 JoinCalifornia 1992 General Election

1992
California
United States Senate